Theodore David Musgrave Sr. (born December 18, 1955) is an American former stock car racing driver.

Pre-NASCAR
Musgrave's father, Elmer, was a famous short-track racer in the Midwest who raced for over 25 years at Soldier Field, O'Hare, Waukegan, and Wilmot, Wisconsin before moving into asphalt late models in the American Speed Association (ASA) and ARCA.  "I was really young at the time," Musgrave said. "But I can still remember sitting in the infield at Milwaukee and watching him race against drivers like Paul Goldsmith. He finally retired so he could help my older brother, Tom, and I get started."  He began racing in 1977 at age 22 at Waukegan in a 1967 Ford Galaxy that he inherited from his brother. He immediately rebuilt the car into a 1967 Ford Torino and won the track's rookie of the year award. He and his father built a Ford Mustang using some tips from Dick Trickle to race the next season.

By 1979 he was a regular driver on the Central Wisconsin (CWRA) circuit, finishing seventh in the season points. Originally from Illinois, Musgrave moved across the nearby state line so that he could race five nights per week in the CWRA. He raced at LaCrosse, State Park Speedway in Wausau, Grundy County Speedway, Wisconsin Dells Speedway (now Dells Raceway Park), and Waukegan. In 1980, he finished second in the points at Wisconsin International Raceway (WIR) behind Alan Kulwicki. Musgrave's highlight of the 1982 season was winning the Holiday 50 at Capital Speedway (now Madison International Speedway). Musgrave qualified the fastest five times in a row at WIR and was leading the points when he battered his wrist in a wreck. He returned the following week in a cast with a special arm support in the car. He finished third in points. Musgrave won ten CWRA features in 1983, including the Holiday 50 at  Capital Super Speedway, the Triple Hot Dog Dash at Wisconsin Dells, and the Race of Champions at Capital's Oktober Nationals. Musgrave won seven features at Capital in 1984, along with two features at LaCrosse, two at State Park, and two at Wisconsin Dells. He ran out of money to fund his team in 1985, and he ended his season early. Musgrave returned in 1986 with a new car which contained several of his experimental ideas. He finished tenth in CWRA points even though he started the season over a month late. He had numerous feature wins that season, including the Firecracker 100 at Capital.

In 1987 he moved to Franklin, Wisconsin and went national in the ASA series in Terry Baker's ride that Bobby Dotter vacated. Musgrave finished 21 of 25 events, winning at the Milwaukee Mile, Birmingham, and Huntsville. He earned rookie of the year honors by finishing fifth in points.

Winston Cup Series
In 1990, Musgrave was called upon by Winston Cup team owner Ray DeWitt to replace Rich Vogler, who had been killed at a wreck at Salem Speedway. Musgrave had four starts in the Cup Series that year, his best finish being a 22nd at the Checker Auto Parts 500. From 1991 to 1993, he raced the No. 55 for the DeWitt/Ulrich team. He was runner-up to Bobby Hamilton for rookie of the year in 1991 and had twelve Top 10 finishes.

In 1992, driving for Dewitt/Ulrich, he led all Winston Cup drivers in laps completed. In 1994, he was hired by Jack Roush to race for Roush Racing in the No. 16 Family Channel-sponsored Ford Thunderbird as a teammate to Mark Martin. In his first season, Musgrave had three poles and finished 15th in points. In 1995, Musgrave had a breakout year of sorts, posting seven Top 5 finishes (including two second-place finishes) and 13 Top 10’s. At one point in the season, he was third in Winston Cup points. He slumped late in the season and finished seventh, but most felt his first race win was just around the corner. The 1996 season turned out to be a disappointment for Musgrave. He usually ran well in most races, but could never find what he needed to get his first win. He had several Top 10’s early in the season, but once again slumped in the second half and wound up 17th in points. He did, however, win the pole for the final Winston Cup race ever held at North Wilkesboro Speedway.

In 1997, Roush vowed to give Musgrave whatever he needed to win his first race.  The No. 16 car now had dual sponsorships from the Family Channel and Primestar. Once again, he started off well, and came very close to his first win, at Darlington Raceway. Musgrave was running second late in the race and clearly had a faster car than leader Dale Jarrett in the closing laps. At one point, he was side by side with Jarrett, but Jarrett held him off for the win. Critics of Musgrave said after the race that he should have been more aggressive and bumped Jarrett out of the way to get his first win. Later in the season at Pocono Raceway, Musgrave had a strong car and was running second late in the race with a chance to win when his car went unexpectedly loose. He ended up fourth. Musgrave was in the Top 10 in points for most of 1997, but a poor final race, at Atlanta, caused him to fall to 12th for the year.

In 1998, Musgrave got full sponsorship from Primestar, and was 18th in points when he was suddenly replaced by rookie Kevin Lepage, to the shock of many. Still, Musgrave filled out 1998 by running part-time for Bud Moore Engineering and Bill Elliott Racing (a team co-owned by Elliott and Dan Marino), as well as doing substitute duty for Travis Carter and Jasper Motorsports. He ended up missing only one race that year and gave Elliott's team its only Top 10 finish with a fifth-place run at Phoenix.

In 1999, Musgrave was signed by Butch Mock Motorsports to run the No. 75 Remington Arms-sponsored Ford. Musgrave struggled  however, and only put together two Top 10 finishes before finally quitting the team after the Pennzoil 400. He began 2000 without a ride, but soon caught on with Joe Bessey Motorsports filling in for the injured Geoffrey Bodine, and ran five races with that team. After a one-race return to the No. 15, Musgrave finished the year with Team SABCO, driving the No. 01 for Kenny Irwin Jr., who was  killed in an accident at New Hampshire International Speedway while practicing for the race.  Musgrave has run seven Cup races since then, six of them with Ultra Motorsports and one for Petty Enterprises, Musgrave's last Cup race came at the 20-caution Sharpie 500 at Bristol in 2003, when he replaced Jimmy Spencer while he served his one race suspension.

Busch Series
Musgrave made his Busch Series debut in 1989 in the All Pro 300 at Charlotte Motor Speedway, driving the No. 98 Buick. He started 31st and wound up in 12th place. He also ran at North Carolina Speedway the next week, finishing 17th. He did not return to the series until 1995, when he was 14th at Charlotte in the No. 9 Ford for Roush Racing. In 1997, Musgrave finished 12th at Darlington Raceway in the No. 40 Ford for Doug Taylor. He also returned for another race in the No. 9 Roush Ford, finishing 36th at Talladega. Musgrave attempted four races in 1999, but only qualified for one, finishing 17th at Rockingham in the No. 29 Pep Boys-sponsored Chevrolet for Gary Bechtel.

For 2000, Musgrave signed with Team SABCO to run nine races in the No. 82 Channellock-sponsored Chevrolet. He earned three Top 20 finishes, including his first Top 10, an eighth at Charlotte Motor Speedway. Musgrave did not return to the series until 2003, when he signed a one-race deal with Tommy Baldwin Racing in the No. 6 Dodge (originally it was supposed to be driven by Jimmy Spencer). In the Food City 250 at Bristol, he started ninth and finished third, earning a career-best finish for both him and the race team. Musgrave also ran one race in 2004, the Emerson Radio 250 at Richmond International Raceway. Driving the No. 86 Dodge, he started 11th but finished 34th after overheating problems.

In 2006, Musgrave was one of many to drive the No. 12 and No. 14 Dodges for FitzBradshaw Racing. In five races, he was able to earn a best finish of 21st at Richmond. His final series race to date was that year's O'Reilly Challenge at Texas Motor Speedway, finishing 34th in the No. 14 Family Dollar-sponsored Dodge.

Craftsman Truck Series

Musgrave made his Craftsman Truck Series debut in 1995 at the GM Goodwrench/Delco Battery 200, driving the No. 61 Ford F-150 for Jack Roush. He started and finished in fourth place. He ran two more races the next year in Roush's No. 99 truck, and finished fifth at Phoenix. He did not run trucks again until 2001, when he signed to drive the No. 1 Mopar-sponsored Dodge Ram for Ultra Motorsports. He won three of out the first five races that year and seven races overall, and had eighteen top-ten finishes, but was unable to catch Jack Sprague for the title. The next two seasons, he had three wins apiece and finished third in both seasons' points. During the 2003 season, Musgrave announced that he had been battling bladder cancer while racing. His wife Debi had been diagnosed with leukemia since 2000. Musgrave appeared to be in position to win the truck championship that year, but in the season-ending Ford 200, Musgrave was penalized for attempting to pass a slower truck low on the final restart past the start-finish line, and surrendered the championship to fellow Wisconsinite Travis Kvapil. "All I can say is next year you're going to see a whole new Ted Musgrave. He's going to be the dirtiest son of a gun going out there on the racetrack and you might as well throw that rulebook away. I ain't going by it no more", Musgrave said in reaction to the penalty.

In 2004, Musgrave did not race dirty as promised, but still raced competitively, winning two races and finishing third in points for the third consecutive year, behind Bobby Hamilton and Dennis Setzer.

In 2005, Musgrave won just one race, winning from the pole position at Gateway International Raceway as he did also in 2001, but he was able to claim the Craftsman Truck Series title. Musgrave moved on to Germain Racing's No. 9 Toyota for 2006 with sponsorship from Team ASE after Ultra Motorsports closed the doors following the 2005 season. Musgrave finished sixth in points in 2006, but failed to win a race that season.

In 2006, he was chosen to drive in the International Race Of Champions for the first time. He was the only driver representing the Craftsman Truck Series for the 2006 season. In 2007, Musgrave was parked for one race after hitting Kelly Bires out of anger under a caution at the Milwaukee Mile. He was parked, fined, and docked points, ending any legitimate shot he had to make a run at the championship. Brad Keselowski was named the replacement driver at Memphis Motorsports Park. That marked the first time in Craftsman Truck Series history that a driver had been suspended from a race.  Later that season, Musgrave got his first career win for Germain Racing at Texas Motor Speedway, breaking a 66-race winless streak. Despite the one-race suspension, Musgrave finished seventh in the series points, marking seven consecutive top-10 points finishes in the Craftsman Truck Series.
After the conclusion of the 2007 season, Germain Racing announced that they would not renew Musgrave's contract for 2008 season. Musgrave was replaced in the No. 9 by rookie Justin Marks. He moved to HT Motorsports for 2008, bringing his ASE sponsorship with him to the No. 59 truck. Eighteen races into the 2008 season, Musgrave and HT parted ways after a practice wreck at Las Vegas Motor Speedway. He was 13th in points at the time of his release.

In 2010, Musgrave was entered in the season-opening NextEra Energy Resources 250 at Daytona. Driving the No. 15 Hope for Haiti-sponsored Toyota for Billy Ballew Motorsports, he started 18th but finished 31st after getting caught in an early multi-car wreck.

Musgrave served as Ron Hornaday Jr.'s spotter for eight races during the 2012 Camping World Truck Series season. A March 2012 press release stated that Musgrave had retired from driving.

Personal life
Musgrave married the former Deborah Pantle. They met while traveling back and forth from Waukegan on Sunday nights. "She was a friend of a friend of my father who needed a ride back to Illinois on Sunday nights," he said. After they married, she trained and showed horses while he raced. They have two sons, Justin and Ted, Jr., and a daughter, Brittany. Justin raced light trucks, and Ted, Jr. raced on the ASA tour.

Motorsports career results

NASCAR
(key) (Bold – Pole position awarded by qualifying time. Italics – Pole position earned by points standings or practice time. * – Most laps led.)

Sprint Cup Series

Daytona 500

Busch Series

Camping World Truck Series

ARCA Permatex SuperCar Series
(key) (Bold – Pole position awarded by qualifying time. Italics – Pole position earned by points standings or practice time. * – Most laps led.)

International Race of Champions
(key) (Bold – Pole position. * – Most laps led.)

References

External links
 

Living people
1955 births
Sportspeople from Waukegan, Illinois
Racing drivers from Illinois
Racing drivers from Milwaukee
Racing drivers from Wisconsin
NASCAR drivers
NASCAR Truck Series champions
International Race of Champions drivers
American Speed Association drivers
NASCAR team owners
People from Franklin, Milwaukee County, Wisconsin
RFK Racing drivers